Atractomorpha is a genus in the Pyrgomorphidae, a family of grasshoppers, found in Africa, Asia, and Australia.

Biology 
Not much is written about the biology of the Atractomorpha, but they are herbivores typical of the Orthoptera, so it is understandable that some species seem to be minor pests in gardens  and that some, such as Atractomorpha psittacina and Atractomorpha bedeli, are significant pests in rice.

As with many grasshoppers in various families, the males are smaller than the females and ride on them long before copulation. They remain there during the period in which the female achieves sexual receptiveness. Similar strategies are common in vertebrates such as some amphibians, as well as various invertebrates, where the males attempt to keep rivals from mating with the female.

At least some Atractomorpha species also share a habit with various generally sedentary Orthoptera such as some Pamphagidae, of producing their excreta in the form of relatively few, large, elongated faecal pellets, one at a time. As each pellet emerges, they kick it a considerable distance away, using  the tibia of one rear leg. This apparently is a strategy for avoiding the attentions of parasitoids and predators that otherwise might have been attracted to the smell of a host midden.

Atractomorpha are active during the day, and their usual habitat is reeds and grasses close to rivers or streams.

Taxonomy 
The genus name Atractomorpha is derived from the Greek language and means "spindle-shaped" or "arrow-shaped". Various families of Orthoptera (including the Acrididae and Lentulidae) include genera whose species have similarly cone-shaped heads, and there are genera within the family Pyrgomorphidae (such as Phymateus and Dictyophorus) that do not have cone-shaped heads, so their superficial appearance may be misleading even for professionals not specifically active in that field.

Species 

The genus consists of the following species:

 Atractomorpha aberrans Moldova, 1788
 Atractomorpha aberrans Karsch, 1888
 Atractomorpha acutipennis Guérin-Méneville, 1844
 Atractomorpha angusta Karsch, 1888
 Atractomorpha australis Rehn, 1907
 Atractomorpha burri Bolívar, 1905
 Atractomorpha crenaticeps Blanchard, 1853
 Atractomorpha crenulata Fabricius, 1793
 Atractomorpha dubia Wang, Xiangyu, He & Mu, 1995
 Atractomorpha fuscipennis Liang, 1988
 Atractomorpha himalayica Bolívar, 1905
 Atractomorpha hypoestes Key & Kevan, 1980
 Atractomorpha lata Mochulsky, 1866
 Atractomorpha melanostriga Bi, 1981
 Atractomorpha micropenna Zheng, 1992
 Atractomorpha nigripennis Zheng, 2000
 Atractomorpha occidentalis Kevan & Chen, 1969
 Atractomorpha orientalis Kevan & Chen, 1969
 Atractomorpha peregrina Bi & Xia, 1981
 Atractomorpha psittacina Haan, 1842
 Atractomorpha rhodoptera Karsch, 1888
 Atractomorpha rufopunctata Bolívar, 1894
 Atractomorpha sagittaris Bi & Xia, 1981
 Atractomorpha similis Bolívar, 1884
 Atractomorpha sinensis Bolívar, 1905
 Atractomorpha suzhouensis Bi & Xia, 1981
 Atractomorpha taiwanensis Yin & Shi, 2007
 Atractomorpha yunnanensis Bi & Xia, 1981

References

External links 
 
 
 Orthoptera Species File
 Photographs

Caelifera genera
Pyrgomorphidae
Taxa named by Henri Louis Frédéric de Saussure